Colposcelis is a genus of darkling beetles in the subfamily Pimeliinae. Species have a palaearctic distribution in Asia.

References

External links 

 Colposcelis at insectoid.info

Tenebrionidae genera
Pimeliinae
Taxa named by Pierre François Marie Auguste Dejean